Awjilah may refer to:

Awjilah language, an Eastern Berber language spoken in Libya
Awjilah, Libya, a town

See also
Awjila-Sokna, a group of Berber languages spoken in Libya and Egypt